Albert Müller (29 November 1897 Basel, Switzerland - 14 December 1926) was a Swiss Expressionist painter, glass artist, draftsman, graphic artist and sculptor.

Life

Müller was born in Basel in 1897. In 1917, he graduated as a glass painter from the general business school in Basel.
In 1919, he received his first exhibition in the Kunsthalle Basel.
In 1920, he traveled to Italy and worked with Niklaus Stoecklin in San Gimignano.

In 1923, Müller became acquainted with the expressionist, Ernst Ludwig Kirchner and his work.
An intense artistic friendship arose.
In 1924, he founded the artist group Rot-Blau together with Hermann Scherer and Paul Camenisch, and later Werner Neuhaus. In the years between 1924 and 1926, he was a frequent guest with Ernst Ludwig Kirchner in Davos Frauenkirch.
In 1926, Müller died suddenly.

Family
His wife Anna died as early as 1927. They had the twin children Judith and Kaspar,

Bibliography

References

External links

 Müller, Albert, SIK ISEA

Swiss artists
1897 births
1926 deaths
Artists from Basel-Stadt